Perttu Hyvärinen (born 5 June 1991) is a Finnish cross-country skier. Born and raised in Kuopio, he has represented Finland in four World Championships and twice in the Olympic Games. He is a silver medalist from the 4 × 10 kilometre relay at the 2023 World Championships. 

Among Hyvärinen's career-best individual performances are a 6th place in the 15 kilometre classical and a 7th place in the 30 km skiathlon at the 2022 Winter Olympics in Beijing. His best individual result in the World Cup is a 5th place from the 10 km classical interval start in Falun during the 2022-23 season. He has two team podium placements, both from relays.

Cross-country skiing results
All results are sourced from the International Ski Federation (FIS).

Olympic Games

Distance reduced to 30 km due to weather conditions.

World Championships
1 medal (1 silver)

World Cup

Season standings

Team podiums
 2 podiums – (2 )

References

External links

1991 births
Living people
Finnish male cross-country skiers
Cross-country skiers at the 2018 Winter Olympics
Cross-country skiers at the 2022 Winter Olympics
Olympic cross-country skiers of Finland
Tour de Ski skiers
People from Kuopio
Universiade bronze medalists for Finland
Universiade medalists in cross-country skiing
Competitors at the 2013 Winter Universiade
Sportspeople from North Savo
21st-century Finnish people
FIS Nordic World Ski Championships medalists in cross-country skiing